Andrés Miguel Grande (born 29 October 1976) is an Argentine former footballer who played as a midfielder.

Club career
Before the second half of 1996–97, Grande was sent on loan to Spanish second tier side Las Palmas, where he made two league appearances. On 18 January 1997, he debuted for Las Palmas during a 2–1 loss to Toledo. In 1998, he signed for Bastia in the French Ligue 1. In 2000, Grande signed for Argentine top flight club Ferro Carril Oeste, where he suffered a torn meniscus and consecutive relegations to the Argentine third tier.

In 2001, he signed for Gueugnon in the French second tier but left due to a passport problem. In 2002, Grande signed for Italian fourth tier team Belluno, helping them earn promotion to the Italian third tier. Before the 2006 season, he signed for Deportivo Quito in Ecuador. In 2007, he signed returned to Italian fourth tier outfit Belluno. In 2009, Grande signed for Trento in the Italian fifth tier. In 2011, he signed for Argentine side Deportivo Español.

International career
Grande represented the Argentina U17 national team at the 1993 FIFA U-17 World Championship, helping them win it.

References

External links
 

1976 births
A.C. Belluno 1905 players
A.C. Trento 1921 players
A.C. Carpi players
Argentina youth international footballers
Argentine expatriate footballers
Argentine expatriate sportspeople in Ecuador
Argentine expatriate sportspeople in France
Argentine expatriate sportspeople in Italy
Argentine expatriate sportspeople in Spain
Argentine footballers
Argentine people of Italian descent
Argentine Primera División players
Argentinos Juniors footballers
Association football midfielders
Deportivo Español footballers
Eccellenza players
Expatriate footballers in Ecuador
Expatriate footballers in France
Expatriate footballers in Italy
Expatriate footballers in Spain
FC Gueugnon players
Ferro Carril Oeste footballers
Ligue 1 players
Ligue 2 players
Living people
People from San Martín, Buenos Aires
Primera C Metropolitana players
Primera Nacional players
Segunda División players
SC Bastia players
S.D. Quito footballers
Serie C players
Serie D players
UD Las Palmas players
Sportspeople from Buenos Aires Province